Kane Kalas (born May 11, 1989) is an American poker player, singer and broadcaster.

Early life 
He is the son of the Philadelphia Phillies play-by-play commentator and Baseball Hall of Fame member Harry Kalas and brother of Todd Kalas, former commentator for the Tampa Bay Rays and current commentator for the Houston Astros. Kalas started playing online poker during his freshman year of college, and switched to live poker afterwards. He was a runner-up at Borgata Poker Open in 2014. Kalas attended Benchmark School in Media, Pennsylvania.

Performances 

Kalas has appeared in several musicals, including Les Miserables, Fiddler on the Roof and Jekyll & Hyde. He has also performed in Beethoven's Fidelio, Neil Simon's Rumors, and in the original production of the opera Augustino and the Puccini Clarinet.

He has sung "The Star-Spangled Banner", "God Bless America", and "Take Me Out to the Ball Game" at a number of Phillies games since 2003 including singing the Star Spangled Banner at every Phillies home opener since 2016.

In 2009, Kalas sang "America the Beautiful" at the Media Memorial Day parade and the national anthem at the Citizens Bank Park in honor of his father who had passed away days before.

In April 2018, Kalas performed the national anthem from his father's statue after a video tribute to honor Roy Halladay, the former Phillies pitcher who was killed in a plane crash in November 2017.

In November 2022, Kalas performed God Bless America during the Game 3 of the 2022 World Series at Citizens Bank Park.

Poker career 

Kalas starting playing online professionally under the handle NASCAR_1949, during his freshman year of college in 2008. Between then and Poker Black Friday, Kalas competed in the largest cash games that have ever run online. He was a regular in Full Tilt Poker's Rail Heaven $500/$1000 No-limit Hold 'em games. During this time, Kalas made poker training videos for Pokernews Strategy, which later changed its name to Poker Phenoms.

Kalas' debut in televised poker occurred on the Fox Sports Network in September 2014, when he placed second in the WPT Borgata Poker Open for a total prize of over $500,000. Later that year, he won the Parx Deep Stax Main Event for $79,015.

Kalas was featured in ESPN's coverage of the 2015 World Series of Poker Main Event, in which he placed 115th for a prize of $52,141.

Kalas is the winner of the biggest pot in televised poker history. In May 2018, he won a $2.18 million pot in the Triton Cash Game from the Triton Super High Roller series held in Montenegro.

He has earned more than $1.25 million in live tournaments. As of June 2018, Kalas has earned $216,849 at various WSOP events.

Kalas moved to Costa Rica to focus full-time on professional online poker playing six months after poker's Black Friday. He has lived for brief periods in Australia, Monte Carlo, and Malta. In 2014, Kalas moved to New Jersey due to the state’s friendly stance toward online poker.

Broadcasting 
Kalas has experience as a broadcaster for PokerGo's World Series of Poker coverage and the Triton Poker Super High Roller Series in Montenegro.

He has broadcast a number of poker events at the Borgata, including the World Poker Tour's coverage of the Borgata Poker Open in September 2016. He has also broadcast poker for WPT Deepstacks, Heartland Poker Tour, Seminole Hard Rock Poker Open, Parx Big Stax, Poker Night in America, Live at the Bike, PokerCentral, and Hustler Casino Live.

References 

1989 births
Living people
American poker players
21st-century American singers
21st-century American male singers
University of Miami alumni